Robotnik (The Worker) was the name of an underground newspaper (bibuła) published by the democratic socialist wing of the Solidarity resistance movement in the People's Republic of Poland during the period of martial law in Poland, between the years 1983 and 1990. It was named after the Polish Socialist Party pre-war periodical of the same name.

See also
Tygodnik Solidarność

References

1983 establishments in Poland
1990 disestablishments in Poland
Defunct newspapers published in Poland
Polish Socialist Party
Polish-language newspapers
Publications established in 1983
Publications disestablished in 1990
Solidarity (Polish trade union)
Socialist newspapers